The 7th Infantry Division (พล.ร.๗.) is an Alpine infantry division of the Royal Thai Army, it is currently a part of the Third Army Area. The unit is composed of the 7th Infantry Regiment and 17th Infantry Regiment. Normally, Thai infantry can fight the mountain terrain to a certain extent, but with the threat along the border that is a struggle between the ethnic minority and the Burmese government, including drug problems. So, the Royal Thai Army has established a mountain infantry unit specializing in fighting in forest, steep, and hard-to-reach areas to respond to the threats of the border with steep mountain forest terrain.

History
The 7th Infantry Division was established by the Abhisit government to approve the proposal of the Ministry of Defence. Later, the Army has severing the order 9/54 on 17 March 2011 to establishing the 7th Infantry Division. It located at Fort Chao Khun Nen, Mae Rim, Chiang Mai.

Organization

7th Infantry Division Headquarters
 7th Infantry Division 
 7th Infantry Regiment
 1st Infantry Battalion
 2nd Infantry Battalion
 5th Infantry Battalion
 17th Infantry Regiment
 2nd Infantry Battalion
 3rd Infantry Battalion
 4th Infantry Battalion
 7th Field Artillery Battalion
 17th Field Artillery Battalion

See also
 Thailand in the Vietnam War
 1st Division (Thailand)
 2nd Infantry Division (Thailand)
 4th Infantry Division (Thailand)
 5th Infantry Division (Thailand)
 9th Infantry Division (Thailand)
 15th Infantry Division (Thailand)
 King's Guard (Thailand)
 Royal Thai Army
 Thai Royal Guards parade

References

Infantry divisions of Thailand
Military units and formations established in 2011